Riverview Branch Library is a branch of the Saint Paul Public Library serving the West Side neighborhood of Saint Paul, Minnesota, United States.  It is a Carnegie library built in 1916.  It was listed on the National Register of Historic Places in 1984 for having local significance in the themes of architecture and education.  It was nominated for being one of only three Carnegie libraries built in Saint Paul, one of the first projects of Saint Paul city architect Charles A. Hausler, one of the last American libraries built with Carnegie Foundation funding, and for being an important neighborhood landmark in Beaux-Arts style.

See also
 List of Carnegie libraries in Minnesota
 National Register of Historic Places listings in Ramsey County, Minnesota

References

External links
 Riverview Branch Library

1916 establishments in Minnesota
Beaux-Arts architecture in Minnesota
Carnegie libraries in Minnesota
Libraries on the National Register of Historic Places in Minnesota
Library buildings completed in 1916
National Register of Historic Places in Saint Paul, Minnesota
Public libraries in Minnesota